Harry Charles Loomis (born October 19, 1876) was an American football player and coach. He served as the head football coach at the University of North Dakota in 1899 and 1902, compiling a record of 9–2–2.

Head coaching record

References

1876 births
Year of death missing
American football fullbacks
Minnesota Golden Gophers football players
North Dakota Fighting Hawks football coaches
People from Charles City, Iowa
Players of American football from Iowa